The Saifee Hospital, is located in the residential area of Hyderi, North Nazimabad, Karachi, Sindh, Pakistan.

This hospital is close to 18 to 20 other hospitals, including Ziauddin Hospital.

See also 
 List of hospitals in Karachi

References

External links 
 Hospitals in Karachi

Dawoodi Bohras
Hospitals in Karachi
Hospitals with year of establishment missing